The Missing Picture is a 2013 Cambodian-French documentary film directed by Rithy Panh about the Khmer Rouge. It was screened in the Un Certain Regard section at the 2013 Cannes Film Festival where it won the top prize. It was also screened in the World Cinema section at the 2013 Cinemanila International Film Festival where it won the Grand Jury Prize. It won the Lumières Award for Best Documentary at the 21st Lumières Awards and was nominated for the César Award for Best Documentary Film at the 41st César Awards.

Overview
This film recreates the atrocities of Cambodia's Khmer Rouge between 1975-1979 through animation, archival footage, and clay diorama figurines handcrafted by sculptor Sarith Mang.  Rithy Panh was born in 1964, and at the age of 11 experienced first-hand the upheaval of the Khmer-Rouge takeover. Panh escaped to Thailand and later immigrated to France and enrolled in Cinema Studies and made a career in cinema. His filmography centered around the Khmer-Rouge, focusing on the genocide and the impact on Cambodia.  Panh is searching for truth as he explains the process of a loss of cultural identity and how systematically Khmer-Rouge came to power and how the loss of culture impacted Cambodian’s everyday lives. Khmer-Rouge sought to re-educate Cambodians and purify them in revolutionary Socialism. Panh lost many family members, including his parents and his siblings and nephews. Panh claims he made this film to "find his childhood." He states "And my childhood returns.  Now it is the boy who seeks me out. I see him.  He wants to speak to me.  But words are hard to find."   In the film he describes seeing his father waste away, wanting to die rather than face the indignities of the brutal regime.  The Khmer-Rouge erased identity and culture.  Every citizen became a number and no longer had a name.  Most Cambodians succumbed to exhaustion and starvation, but approximately 1.5 to 3 million people were killed. Rithy Panh uses the clay figurines to recreate the missing picture from his childhood.  The visual novelty of the documentary resides in the first-person narration, which is given with the help of little clay figurines. Miniatures tell the story of hunger, fear, torture, death, dream and hope. They are set in the jungle, in rice fields, in private houses or in schools. This narrative device is brilliant, because it conjures up so many aspects of Panh’s youth. Clay figurines, like lead soldiers, are childhood toys, a childhood that Panh is seeking, "unless my childhood is seeking me." Panh also states  "I seek my childhood like a lost picture," Douc says on his behalf in the film's opening voiceover. "Or rather, it seeks me." With "The Missing Picture," Panh sought—and found—his own hard-earned truth."

The Missing Picture seeks to provide the visuals for an era lost.  Most of the films and photographs from prior to 1975 were destroyed.  Nearly every camera after 17 April 1975, the day the Communists took Phnom Penh, was destroyed, as cameras were seen as an instrument of lies and propaganda by the new regime.  Those images of dances, birthdays, evidence of human times, were gone forever. "Panh believes deeply in cinema and the restorative, communicative power of moving images.

The ultimate insult, then, is to see how the Khmer Rouge’s version of cinema was a total lie, a neutered version of events meant to sell the revolution to communist elites around the world – "those in Paris" as the voiceover angrily puts it – who directly or tacitly supported the Khmer Rouge and accepted at face value its covered-up monstrosity."   "At times Panh’s memory sickness is too colored with middle-class naivety: the pre-crisis era in Cambodia was much more complicated, of course, than the blissfully dancehall world he recreates with clay (he acknowledges as much by pointing out how the Khmer Rouge manipulated real class issues to gain power)."

Today, Panh actively teaches and mentors Cambodian filmmakers.  In 2006 he started the Audiovisual Center Bophana. Audiovisual Center Bophana was opened on 4 December 2006 in Phnom Penh Cambodia. Partnering with the French Ministry of Foreign Affairs, the Cambodian Ministry of Culture and Fine Arts, the National Audiovisual Institute, the Thomson Foundation for the Cinematic and Television Heritage, The International Francophonie Organization, The French Ministry of Culture and Communication; The National Center for the Cinema and UNESCO, the Center not only collects images and sounds of the Cambodian memory and makes them available to a wide public, but also trains Cambodians in the audiovisual professions by welcoming foreign film productions and its own artistic projects.

The film was nominated for the Best Foreign Language Film at the 86th Academy Awards. Approximately half of the film is news and documentary footage, while the other half uses clay figurines to dramatise what happened in Cambodia when Pol Pot came to power.

Cast
 Randal Douc as the narrator (original French version)
 Jean-Baptiste Phou (English version)

Reception
The Missing Picture has an approval rating of 99% on review aggregator website Rotten Tomatoes, based on 88 reviews, and an average rating of 8.26/10. The website's critical consensus states, "Thrillingly unorthodox and emotionally searing without being didactic, The Missing Picture is a uniquely poignant documentary -- and so much more". It also has a score of 87 out of 100 on Metacritic, based on 23 critics, indicating "universal acclaim".

See also
 List of submissions to the 86th Academy Awards for Best Foreign Language Film
 List of Cambodian submissions for the Academy Award for Best Foreign Language Film

References

External links
 
 

2013 films
2013 documentary films
French documentary films
Cambodian documentary films
Documentary films about the Cambodian genocide
2010s French-language films
Films directed by Rithy Panh
2010s French films